The Treaty of Stockholm may refer to:

Treaty of Stockholm (1371)
Treaty of Stockholm (1435)
Treaty of Stockholm (1465)
Treaty of Stockholm (1497)
Treaty of Stockholm (1502)
Treaty of Stockholm (1523)
Treaty of Stockholm (1672)
Treaty of Stockholm (1719) - Hannover
Treaty of Stockholm (1720) - Prussia
Treaty of Stockholm (1720) - Denmark
Treaty of Stockholm (1813)
Treaty of Stockholm (1884) - establishes mutual defensive alliance between Russia and Germany; Russia and Austria-Hungary recognize each other's territorial possessions.
Stockholm Convention on organic pollutants